Cephalotus ( or ; Greek: κεφαλή "head", and οὔς/ὠτός "ear", to describe the head of the anthers) is a genus which contains one species,  Cephalotus follicularis the Albany pitcher plant, a small carnivorous pitcher plant. The pit-fall traps of the modified leaves have inspired the common names for this plant, which include 'Albany pitcher plant", "Western Australian pitcher plant", "Australian pitcher plant", or "fly-catcher plant." It is an evergreen herb that is endemic to peaty swamps in the southwestern corner of Western Australia.

Description 
Cephalotus follicularis is a small, low growing, herbaceous species. Evergreen leaves appear from underground rhizomes, are simple with an entire leaf blade, and lie close to the ground. The insectivorous leaves are small and have the appearance of moccasins, forming the 'pitcher' of the common name. The pitchers develop a dark red colour in high light levels but stay green in shadier conditions. The foliage is a basal arrangement that is closely arranged with outward facing adapted leaf blades. These leaves give the main form of the species a height around 20 cm.

The 'pitcher' trap of the species is similar to other pitcher plants. The peristome at the entrance of the trap has a spiked arrangement that allows the prey to enter, but hinders its escape. The lid over the entrance, the operculum, prevents rainwater entering the pitcher and thus diluting the digestive enzymes inside. Insects trapped in this digestive fluid are consumed by the plant. The operculum has translucent cells which confuse its insect prey as they appear to be patches of sky.

The inflorescence is groupings of small, hermaphroditic, six-parted, regular flowers, which are creamy, or whitish.

In the cooler months of winter (down to about 5 degrees Celsius), they have a natural dormancy period of about 3–4 months, triggered by the temperature drop and reduced light levels.

Taxonomy

Taxonomic history 
On 2 January 1802 the expedition's botanist, Robert Brown, wrote in his diary:

 
This represents the earliest documentary reference to this species; and although not entirely unambiguous as to the first collection, it is usually taken as evidence that the plant was discovered by Ferdinand Bauer and William Westall on 1 January 1802. Whether or not there was an earlier collection is largely immaterial, however, as all collections were incorporated into Brown's collection without attribution, so Brown is treated as the collector in botanical contexts.

Brown initially gave this species the manuscript name "'Cantharifera paludosa' KG III Sound", but this name was not published, and it would not be Brown who published the first description.

The following year, further specimens were collected by Jean Baptiste Leschenault de la Tour, botanist to Nicolas Baudin's expedition. In 1806, Jacques Labillardière used these specimens as the basis of his publication of the species in Novae Hollandiae plantarum specimen. Labillardière did not attribute Leschenault as the collector, and it was long thought that Labillardière had collected the plant himself during his visit to the area in the 1790s; in particular, Brown wrongly acknowledged Labillardière as the discoverer of this plant.

Leschenault's specimen was a fruiting plant, but the fruit was in poor condition, and as a result Labillardière erroneously placed it in the family Rosaceae. This error was not corrected until better fruiting specimens were collected by William Baxter in the 1820s. These were examined by Brown, who concluded that the plant merited its own family, and accordingly erected Cephalotaceae. It has remained in this monogeneric family ever since.

Current placement 
The Australian pitcher plant is an advanced rosid, and thus closer related to apples and oaks than to other pitcher plants like Nepenthaceae (basal core eudicots) and Sarraceniaceae (basal asterids). The placement of its monotypic family Cephalotaceae in the order Saxifragales has been abandoned. It is now placed within the order of Oxalidales where it is most closely related to Brunelliaceae, Cunoniaceae, and Elaeocarpaceae. The monotypic arrangement of the family and genus is indicative of a high degree of endemism, one of four such species of the region.

Ecology 
The plant occurs in southern coastal districts of the Southwest botanical province in Australia; it has been recorded in the Warren, southern Jarrah Forest, and Esperance Plains regions. Its habitat is on moist peaty sands found in swamps or along creeks and streams, but it is tolerant of less damp situations. Its population in the wild has been reduced by habitat destruction and overcollecting; it is therefore classified as Vulnerable species (VU A2ac; C2a(i)) by the IUCN. However, this classification is not in unison with Australia's national  EPBC Act List of Threatened Species or Western Australia's Wildlife Conservation Act 1950, which both list the species as Not Threatened.

The larvae of Badisis ambulans, an ant-like wingless micropezid fly, develop inside the pitchers. They have never been found anywhere else.

Cultivation 

Cephalotus are cultivated worldwide. In the wild, they prefer warm day-time temperatures of up to 25 degrees Celsius during the growing season, coupled with cool night-time temperatures. It is commonly grown in a mixture of sphagnum peat moss, perlite, and sand, a reasonable humidity (60–80%) is also preferred. It is successfully propagated from root and leaf cuttings, usually non-carnivorous leaves although pitchers can also be used.  A dormancy period is probably crucial to long-term health of the plant.

The plants become colourful and grow vigorously when kept in direct sunlight, while plants cultivated in bright shade remain green.

Living plants were delivered to Kew Gardens by Phillip Parker King in 1823. A specimen flowered in 1827 and provided one source for an illustration in Curtis's Botanical Magazine.

This plant is a recipient of the Royal Horticultural Society's Award of Garden Merit.

There are several dozen Cephalotus clones that exist in cultivation; nine have been officially registered as cultivars. One of the most well-known is 'Eden Black', a cultivar with unusually dark-coloured pitchers.

Genomics
The genome of the pitcher plant Cephalotus follicularis has been sequenced. Its carnivorous and non-carnivorous leaves have been compared to identify genetic differences associated with key features relating to the attraction of prey and their capture, digestion and nutrient absorption. Results support the independent convergent evolution of Cephalotus and other carnivorous plant lineages. but also suggest that different lineages co-opted similar genes in developing digestive functions. This implies that the ways in which carnivory can be developed are limited.

See also 
 Carnivorous plants of Australia

References

External links 

 
 
 Inner World of Cephalotus follicularis from the John Innes Centre

Monotypic Oxalidales genera
Oxalidales
Oxalidales of Australia
Carnivorous plants of Australia
Rosids of Western Australia
Vulnerable flora of Australia
Endemic flora of Southwest Australia